The red-eared slider × yellow-bellied slider (Trachemys scripta elegans × Trachemys scripta scripta) is an intergradation of a red-eared slider and yellow-bellied slider subspecies. On the side of its head where a normal yellow-bellied slider would have solid yellow, there will be red interposed. The bottom of the shell is a bright yellow with varying numbers of black dots. In the wild it eats minnows, plants, carrion, snails and insects that fall in the water. The average lifespan is usually over 30 years.  
The yellow facial markings of the yellowbelly are more distinct in this species but the red ear can still be seen

This species often behaves similarly to the red eared slider

References

External links
 Variation and Species Status of Slider Turtles (Emydidae: Trachemys) in the Southwestern United States and Adjacent Mexico
 Hybrid Red Eared Slider X Yellow Belly Slider at YouTube

Trachemys
Hybrid animals
Intraspecific hybrids